Meet the Orphans is the fourth studio album by reggaeton artist, Don Omar, released on November 16, 2010. The album features the artists under the "Orfanato Music Group" label and other reggaeton artists. The album includes the promotional single "Hasta Abajo" and the album's lead single "Danza Kuduro" featuring French-born Portuguese singer Lucenzo, as well as collaborations from Don Omar’s Orfanato Music Group. artists including Kendo Kaponi, Danny Fornaris, Syko, Plan B, Zion & Lennox, and Yaga & Mackie. It was nominated for a Lo Nuestro Award for Urban Album of the Year.

The album and singles won 8 Awards for Billboard Latin Music Awards  and finalists for 16 nominations in 14 categories. and was nominated for Latin Grammy Awards in 2011.

The album and artist were recognized in Billboard. and the album was top 1 Latin Albums Chart History, and was top 38 Latin Albums of the 2010s. and the album was top 81 Current Albums Sales in 2010.

The artist signed a contract with EMI Music Publishing in 2010 and was of best performance in Billboard Latin Music Awards in 2011.  The artist was top 5 Top latín artists of the year in Billboard in 2011. The artist was top 2 Social 50 of Billboard,  and was Top 15 latin artists in 2019.

The album made tour for worldwide.

Background
The album was initially planned as the re-release album from iDon, titled first iDon 2.0, and later Prototype 2.0. In September 2009, Reggaeton singer Daddy Yankee confirmed work on Omar's new album, following by the remix version of "Hasta Abajo". However, none of the collaborations with Yankee including the remix, were included on the album. It was set to be released in fall 2009 but was cancelled. Following the cancellation of the re-release album from iDon, it was announced that Don Omar would turn his attention to recording a new full length collaboration album from scratch which would feature other reggaeton artists.

Release
The album was set to be released on August 24, 2010 through Orfanato Music Group. back later was on October 19, 2010, the album was to be released finally on November 2, 2010 but the release date was newly changed to November 16, 2010. The album was released on two editions, a Standard edition with 14 tracks and a Deluxe edition that includes 19 tracks and the music video of "Danza Kuduro", both editions were released the same day. On the iTunes Store both editions include the bonus track "Carta al Cielo" and a Digital booklet.

Reception

Critical response

David Jeffries from Allmusic gave the album 3.5 stars out of 5. Here is an extract of his review: "a mix of new and old music – a must for Don Omar fans and worth considering if you’re curious, but unfamiliar, with what’s happening in the reggaeton genre 2010."

Allison Stewart from The Washington Post said that "Omar is on safer ground on Don Omar Presents: Meet the Orphans, a collection of tracks spotlighting the artists and producers of his El Orfanato record label. It's a curiously old-fashioned concept, like an old-school mix tape or a lower-wattage version of P. Diddy's epochal '01 Bad Boy showcase, The Saga Continues. Though Meet the Orphans is studded with tales of social uplift (like the sluggish, serious "Angeles Y Demonios"), it's most agreeable when it sticks to fare like last summer's inescapable "Danza Kuduro", a warp-speed, tropical/meringue/pop redo of French Portuguese singer Lucenzo's hit "Vem dançar kuduro" (with Lucenzo included).

Chart performance and sales
In United States, Meet the Orphans debuted at #101 with sales of 7,420, on the Billboard 200. The album sold 40,000 copies on Top Latin Albums in 2011. the album and song Danza Kuduro  sold 1,000 sales in Billboard in 2011.  The album sold over 1,5 million units singles sales, being 2 million singles.  The album also debuted at #2 on Billboard’s Top Latin Albums charts, and became his seventh top ten album and his sixth highest album debut on the top ten, it also debuted at #1 on Billboard’s Latin Rhythm Albums charts.  and at #8 on Billboard’s Top Rap Albums charts. According to Universal Music Latino, the album certified platinum after its first 48 hours sales in Southern California. On the Mexican Albums Chart the album debuted at #81. The following week the album jumped at #69 and peaked at #47.

Promotion
Prior to the release of the album, four promotional singles were released exclusively on Apple's iTunes Store as a "Countdown to Meet the Orphans". The album Meet The Orphans was top with songs Billboard.

"Hooka" was released as the first promotional single and it was released on iTunes on September 21, 2010. It features Plan B. was top 10 Latin Digital Song Sales for Billboard in 2010. and was top 10 Best Collaborations for Billboard in 2021.
"Good Looking" was released as the second promotional single and it was released on iTunes on September 28, 2010. was top 32 Latin Digital Song Sales for Billboard in 2010.
"El Duro" was released as the third promotional single and it was released on iTunes on October 12, 2010. It features Kendo Kapponi. was top 28 Latin Digital Song Sales for Billboard in 2010.
"Ángeles y Demonios" was released as the fourth promotional single and it was released on iTunes on October 19, 2010. It features Kendo Kapponi and Syko.

Singles
"Danza Kuduro" was released as the album's lead single on August 15, 2010, it features French singer Lucenzo, who is of Portuguese origin. The song topped on the Billboard Latin Songs, becoming his second number-one single on the chart. A music video directed by long-time Don Omar collaborator Carlos Pérez was released on July 30, 2010 through Omar's Facebook account.
"Huérfano De Amor" was released as the second single early 2011, the song features Syko. The music video was premiered on January 6, 2011. It was directed by Alejandro Santiago Ciena.
"Taboo" was released as the album's third single on January 24, 2011. The video for this single was shot in St. Maarten and was directed by Marlon Pena. Additionally, it incorporates a sample from Kaoma's 1989 single "Lambada" fused with Latin beats.
"Estoy Enamorado" included on the Deluxe Edition from the album, performed only by Danny Fornaris, was released to radio as the fourth single in conjunction to "Huérfano De Amor". The video for the song was released on March 10, 2011.

Other releases
"Hasta Abajo" was released as the album's promo single on November 17, 2009. The song was charted at number nine on the Billboard Latin Songs, becoming his seventh top ten single on the chart. The music video for the song, also directed by Carlos Pérez, was premiered on November 14, 2010.
"Ella Ella" was released on November 16, 2010, with collaboration Zion y Lennox production by Robin,  was top 45 Latin Digital Song Sales for Billboard.

Track listing

Notes
On the iTunes Store both editions include a Digital booklet as bonus content.
In some Deluxe editions, the track list may include in different order, the same tracks.

Personnel 
Taken and adapted from Allmusic.com.

William Omar Landrón (Don Omar) – composer, executive producer, producer
Juan A. Abreu – composer
Faouze Barkati – composer
Everton Bonner – composer
Lincoln Noel Castañeda – composer
Sly Dunbar – composer
Natalia Gutiérrez – composer
Gonzalo Hermosa – composer
Ulises Hermosa – composer
De Oliveira Philippe Louis (Lucenzo) – composer, producer
Robin Méndez – composer
Joel Baez Nieves – composer
Féliz Ortiz – composer
Raphy Pina – composer
Gabriel Pizarro – composer
Christian Ramos – composer

Milton J. Restituyo – composer
José F. Rivera – composer (Kendo Kapponi)
Armando Rosario – composer
Philip Smart – composer
John Taylor – composer
Fabrice Toigo – composer
Lloyd "Gitsy" Willis – composer
Daniel Fornaris – composer, producer
Danny Fornaris – composer, producer
Eliel Lind – composer, producer
Tom Coyne – mastering
A&X – producer
Jonathan De La Cruz (Lil Wizard)– Producer & Composer
Marcos G – producer
Reggie Delgadillo – producer
Vincent Eget – director
Danny Hastings – director, photography

Charts

Year end charts

Sequel

Don Omar Presents MTO²: New Generation

A sequel of Meet the Orphans, called MTO 2: New Generation is in works. The release date has not been announced yet but the previews of two songs were released through YouTube on April 17. One is called Tus Movimientos featuring Natti Natasha, and the other one is called Zumba. In the official website of Orphanato Music Group it is said that "the album will contain 14 songs that will make history in music".

See also
List of number-one Billboard Latin Rhythm Albums of 2010

References

External links
Don Omar –  official music website at Universal Music Latin Entertainment
Orphandon.com

2010 albums
Don Omar albums
Spanish-language albums
Machete Music albums
Orfanato Music Group compilation albums
Albums produced by Luny Tunes